Treaty of Adrianople or Treaty of Edirne may refer to several treaties signed in Edirne (formerly Adrianople):

 Peace of Szeged (1444), between the Ottoman Empire and Hungary
 Truce of Adrianople (1547), between the Ottoman Empire and the Habsburgs  
 Treaty of Adrianople (1568), between the Ottoman Empire and the Habsburgs  
 Treaty of Adrianople (1713), between the Ottoman Empire and Russia
 Treaty of Adrianople (1829), between the Ottoman Empire and Russia